Liu Hui (born September 1966) is a Chinese politician and the current executive vice governor of Anhui. He is a representative of the 19th National Congress of the Communist Party of China.

Early life and education
Liu was born in Li County, Hunan, in September 1966. In 1981, he enrolled at Renmin University of China where he received his bachelor's degree in statistics in 1985 and his master's degree in economics in 1990. He was a teacher at Beijing FRP Research and Design Institute between July 1985 and September 1987.

After university, he joined the Department of Supply and Marketing Cooperation Management, Ministry of Commerce (now ), becoming director of Cooperation Guidance Department in November 2005 and director of International Cooperation Department in April 2010.

Career in Inner Mongolia
In October 2010, he was transferred to Hohhot, capital of north China's Inner Mongolia, and appointed party secretary of Xincheng District and admitted to member of the standing committee of the Hohhot Municipal Party Committee, the city's top authority. In December 2013, he became deputy party secretary of Wuhai, concurrently serving as secretary of its Commission for Discipline Inspection, the party's agency in charge of anti-corruption efforts. When he returned to Hohhot in August 2014, he took up the post of director of Inner Mongolia Autonomous Region Party Committee Inspection Leading Group Office, and in January 2016 was promoted to member of the standing committee of the Inner Mongolia Regional Party Committee, the region's top authority. He also served as secretary of Inner Mongolia Regional Politics and Law Commission from February 2016 to September 2016.

Career in Anhui
In September 2016, he was transferred to central Anhui province, where he was appointed secretary of its Commission for Discipline Inspection, and became member of the standing committee of the Anhui Provincial Party Committee. In January 2018, he concurrently served as chairman of the newly founded Anhui Provincial Supervisory Commission, the highest anti-corruption agency in the province. On 29 September 2021, he rose to become executive vice governor of Anhui, replacing .

References

1966 births
Living people
People from Li County, Hunan
Renmin University of China alumni
People's Republic of China politicians from Hunan
Chinese Communist Party politicians from Hunan